Fiendish is the first album released by composer Phideaux Xavier. (Their previous album Friction isn't considered official by the band.) 

In 2002, Phideaux began to work with Gabriel Moffat on a series of new demos. He got back together with drummer Rich Hutchins and recorded songs for what would become the album Fiendish. The finished work was described by Phideaux as "progressive space folk".

The longest track, "Soundblast," took its lyrics from a leaflet dropped over Japan shortly after the detonation of the Little Boy atomic bomb at Hiroshima.

This album was released in 2003, despite 2004 being referred to as the copyright year on the artwork.

Tracks
"Fragment" (04:12)
"Animal Games" (03:30)
"100 Mg" (03:12)
"100 Coda" (02:24)
"Hellphone" (02:10)
"Little Monster" (05:12)
"Headstones" (04:15)
"Fiendish" (02:59)
"Vultures & Mosquitoes" (04:18)
"Soundblast" (07:17)
"Space Brother" (05:23)

Phideaux Xavier albums
2003 albums